The Albion Independent School District is a school district based in Albion, Oklahoma, United States. It contains a single school serving Kindergarten-Grade 8.

See also
List of school districts in Oklahoma

References

External links
 Albion Overview
 Albion Public School

School districts in Oklahoma
Education in Pushmataha County, Oklahoma